Derrick Johnson is an American lawyer and humanitarian. He serves as the 19th President and CEO of the NAACP. He had previously served as president of its Mississippi state chapter, and vice chairman of its board of directors. Johnson is the founder of the Mississippi nonprofit group One Voice Inc., which aims to improve quality of life for African Americans through public engagement.

Early life and education
Johnson was born in Detroit. He attended Tougaloo College, then studied law at the South Texas College of Law, where he was awarded his Juris Doctor.

NAACP

At the NAACP, Johnson works closely with the national staff, including Wisdom Cole, the National Director of the NAACP Youth & College Division for the Association.

NAACP Image Awards
At the 2020 NAACP Image Awards, hosted by BET, Rihanna accepted the President's Award from Derrick Johnson. Johnson stated that “Rihanna has not only enjoyed a groundbreaking career as an artist and musician, but has also distinguished herself as a stellar public servant. From her business achievements through Fenty, to her tremendous record as an activist and philanthropist, Rihanna epitomizes the type of character, grace, and devotion to justice that we seek to highlight in our President's Award.”

Re-envisioning of the NAACP
In a statement, the NAACP announced that President Johnson was elected President to guide "the Association through a period of re-envisioning and reinvigoration."

On June 30, 2020, with Mayor Muriel Bowser's support, the NAACP announced its plans to move its headquarters from Baltimore to Washington, D.C. NPR reported, "Muriel Bowser, the mayor of the District of Columbia, said the plan is to have the NAACP move to the city's historic U Street corridor."

2020 election
In an interview with GQ Magazine, Derrick Johnson expressed that the NAACP does not endorse Presidential candidates. "We don't endorse candidates or political parties. I'm going to embrace the need to increase voter turnout in the Black community. Then we allow the voters to make a determination of the options on the ballot, which of the two they're going to select," Johnson stated. On June 10, 2020, the NAACP hosted a virtual town hall with former Vice President Joe Biden.

When asked about Trump, President Johnson expressed, "In my lifetime, I have not seen a single president as bad as Trump. I vacillate between whether or not it's malicious intent, incompetence, a very narrow, myopic view of the world, narcissism... We have not in my lifetime seen anyone so narrowly focused on personal ego and not what's in the best interest of public citizens. It's one thing to disagree about public policy and tax policy; it's a completely different thing to destroy the faith in our system the way he does."

Jimmy Fallon interview
On June 1, 2020, Johnson joined Jimmy Fallon on the Tonight Show. In the interview, Fallon apologized for wearing blackface in an old Saturday Night Live sketch that had resurfaced. Jimmy Fallon expressed, "the silence is the biggest crime that white guys like me and the rest of us are doing, staying silent. We need to say something, we need to keep saying something, and we need to say 'That's not OK' more than one day on Twitter." In response to the apology, Derrick Johnson noted “that was powerful, but most importantly, that's about courage ... In this time of many people searching for answers and the display of anger and hopelessness and wandering, more people need to speak about where they are with a really authentic voice. And I think you did that with the opening monologue.”  Derrick Johnson later added, "we are all born flawed, but flawed is part of the journey we are on to get to perfection. If anyone can stand up and say, 'I haven't made a mistake,' run, because that person is clearly a liar."

DACA
On June 18, 2020, in Trump v. NAACP, the Supreme Court of the United States blocked the Trump administration's effort to rescind DACA in "Donald J. Trump, President of the United States, et al., Petitioners v. National Association for the Advancement of Colored People, et al." The Supreme Court ruled in favor of the NAACP in a 5-to-4 decision. President Trump later wrote in a tweet that this was a "shotgun blasts into the face of people that are proud to call themselves Republicans or Conservatives."

GQ Magazine reported that under Derrick Johnson's leadership, "the nation's foremost and oldest civil rights organization landed a huge win in its Supreme Court case — Trump v. NAACP — that prevents Donald Trump's administration from rescinding the Deferred Action for Childhood Arrivals program for young immigrants." Johnson added, "It's a huge victory for us."

On June 25, 2020, The Hill reported that the NAACP "successfully convinced the Supreme Court to rule against Trump. Its decision to defend DACA, Johnson said, came in part because of the organization's traditional role of being a voice for Black communities, including immigrants. “DACA, oftentimes people seem to think of the Latinx community, when in fact it was far more reaching than that,” Johnson said."

President Derrick Johnson, expressed in a statement: "For far too long, the voices of the undocumented DACA recipients from the African Diaspora were silenced. There is no democratic dream for anyone if we don't allow our DREAMers to fully participate. This is a tremendous victory for America. Today's Supreme Court ruling in our favor is an incredible victory for justice, in the spirit of the NAACP's groundbreaking Supreme Court victory in Brown v Board of Education. We know the value of affirmative litigation to ensure that the nation lives up to its ideals. This ruling exemplifies the ways in which ensuring the Civil Rights for our community pushes the needle on social justice for the benefit of all. Although today represents an exciting victory, we won a battle; the war wages on. Trump could rescind DACA again tomorrow if he wants. The fight truly ends when Congress passes a permanent solution that protects DREAMERS, and the NAACP will continue that fight along with its allies."

The Washington Post also reported that "Trump has often seemed ambivalent about DACA recipients — lauding them at some points and declaring they are “no angels” at others — but his administration has tried since September 2017 to end the program. It was implemented as an executive action by Obama in 2012 after a failed congressional attempt at comprehensive immigration reform."

Justice Roberts wrote in an opinion that "the dispute before the court is not whether DHS may rescind DACA. All parties agree that it may. The dispute is instead primarily about the procedure the agency followed in doing so..."

Facebook: Stop Hate For Profit campaign
In the summer of 2020, the NAACP launched the Stop Hate For Profit campaign, targeting Facebook and its founder Mark Zuckerberg for refusing to take down hate speech on the platform. In a live interview on MSNBC's Morning Joe, Johnson called Facebook "one of the biggest threats to democracy'. It was later revealed that The Duke and Duchess of Sussex, Prince Harry and Meghan Markle were working with the NAACP in this campaign. President Johnson praised the couple for embodying “the kind of leadership that meets the moment." He added, "The NAACP deeply value your unwavering support to Stop Hate For Profit."

In an interview with Forbes, Johnson said, "the flagrant disregard Facebook has shown in putting a stop to the hateful lies and dangerous propaganda on its platform exemplifies a lack of concern for the greater public and nullifies any notion of corporate social responsibility coming from its leadership. Any brand that claims to have the best interest of its consumers in mind should undoubtedly join the #StopHateForProfit campaign. Facebook is ultimately damaging its credibility with the American public, and any company that wants to avoid doing the same should send a message that we will no longer accept disinformation during this critical time."

By July 3, over 750 advertisers joined the boycott, including Unilever, Ben & Jerry's, Patagonia, The North Face, Lululemon Athletica, Coca-Cola, Ford, Starbucks, Target, Pfizer, Microsoft, PlayStation, LEGO, Dunkin Donuts, Best Buy, Adidas, Clorox, and Walgreens.

In response to these efforts, on July 1, 2020, CNBC reported that "Facebook Chief Executive Mark Zuckerberg has agreed to meet with the organizers of the boycott, a spokeswoman said late Tuesday."

On July 7, 2020, Members of the Stop Hate For Profit coalition met with Facebook CEO Mark Zuckerberg. CNN first reported that the meeting "didn't go well". Derrick Johnson added, in an interview with The New York Times, that “Over the two years that the N.A.A.C.P. has been in conversation with Facebook, we’ve watched the dialogue blossom into nothingness,” Mr. Johnson said. “They lack this cultural sensitivity to understand that their platform is actually being used to cause harm, or they understand the harm that the platform is causing and they have chosen to take the profit as opposed to protecting the people.”

CBS Studios partnership

On July 15, 2020, The NAACP and President Johnson announced a multi-year deal with CBS Television Studios. Variety announced that "Under the deal, the two organizations will work together to develop and produce scripted, unscripted, and documentary projects for linear and streaming platforms. The partnership will be aimed toward elevating a diverse range of voices as well as increasing the visibility of Black artists. The deal includes a commitment to develop projects for CBS Television Network but also allows the selling of show to outside entities."

The Hollywood Reporter added, "Included in the deal is a commitment to not only develop for CBS-owned platforms but also to third-party platforms, meaning CBS/NAACP would own content that would be supplied to other buyers like Netflix and Amazon."

"In this moment of national awakening, the time has never been better to further tell stories of the African American experience,” said NAACP CEO Derrick Johnson. "Programming and content have the power to shape perspectives and drive conversations around critical issues. This partnership with CBS allows us to bring compelling and important content to a broad audience."

Meeting with President Biden 

Johnson and others met with President Joe Biden on July 8, 2021. The meeting focused on the issue of voting rights. Johnson stated, following the meeting, that he was "encouraged" by the President's commitment to the issue.

Other works

Hurricane Katrina
The Chief Justice of the Mississippi Supreme Court appointed Derrick Johnson to the Mississippi Access to Justice Commission. The Governor of Mississippi also appointed Johnson as the Chair of the Governor's Commission for Recovery, Rebuilding, and Renewal after his humanitarian work following Hurricane Katrina.

The Guardian 
On June 3, 2020, The Guardian published an op-ed by Johnson titled "In America, Black deaths are not a flaw in the system. They are the system." In the op-ed, Johnson wrote, "we are 3.5 times more likely to die of COVID-19 than white people. Although Black people are only 13% of the population, we constitute about twice that percentage of US coronavirus cases. This is not because the coronavirus seeks us by color; it is because we suffer from an underlying condition. Say its name. The condition is racism. It is manifest in a lack of opportunity; in economic inequality; in the absence of healthcare; in a biased criminal justice system and mass incarceration; in schools that scream for care; in a denial of truth; and more." This op-ed was quoted the following day by Wolf Blitzer on CNN, in a special coverage of George Floyd's memorial.

"Real Facebook Oversight Board"
On September 25, 2020, Johnson was named as one of the 25 members of the "Real Facebook Oversight Board", an independent monitoring group over Facebook.

COVID-19 
In a piece on CNN, Derrick Johnson wrote, "it wasn't a surprise to many of us that the shortage of hospitals and health care providers serving our communities, combined with the biased assumptions that lead doctors to undertreat Black people's pain and heart attacks, would result in African Americans finding it harder to get tested and treated. And we knew that as soon as the pandemic became racialized, many Americans would no longer be willing to make sacrifices in order to address a crisis that suddenly seemed to be not about "us" but about "them."" He added, "Lives and livelihoods are at stake, most acutely in Black and brown communities -- but so is our democracy. We are seeing high levels of scarcity, with extreme unemployment numbers, while the nation's chief executive uses his bully pulpit to sow division and demonize otherness. With the elections approaching, our country could sink to a level of tribalism that leads to violence."

Notes

References

External links 
 

American nonprofit chief executives
NAACP activists
Living people
Year of birth missing (living people)
Tougaloo College alumni
South Texas College of Law alumni
Activists from Detroit
African-American activists